The English, Scottish & Australian Bank Limited was an Australian bank founded in 1852 by Royal Charter in London and named English, Scottish and Australian Chartered Bank. Following a financial reconstruction in 1893 its business was renamed English, Scottish and Australian Bank Limited.

Known to all as ES&A it merged with ANZ on 1 October 1970 to form Australia and New Zealand Banking Group Limited.

History
ES&A opened its first Australian branch in Sydney in 1853. Australian banknotes were printed by the bank and issued at branches in Sydney, Adelaide, Hobart and Melbourne. In 1893 its business was renamed the English, Scottish & Australian Bank Limited following a financial upheaval.

It was one of 16 banks which supplied blank note forms to the Australian Government in 1911 which were superscribed as redeemable in gold and issued as the first Commonwealth notes.

The Commercial Bank of Tasmania and the London Bank of Australia were taken over in 1921 and the Royal Bank of Australia in 1927.

On 1 October 1970 ES&A merged with the Australia and New Zealand Bank to form the Australia and New Zealand Banking Group Limited. At the time of the merger ES&A had a network of about 570 branches across Australia.

Esanda
Esanda was a consumer finance division of ES&A which began separate operations in 1955. Its name is an acronym of ES&A. In 2015 ANZ sold Esanda to Macquarie Group.

Executive leadership

Chairmen

Notable staff
Charles Wren became the accountant and branch inspector for South Australia in 1881. He moved to Melbourne in 1888 as inspector's accountant. He was appointed resident inspector in New South Wales in 1901, and became the bank's Australasian general manager in July 1909.

References

External links
English, Scottish & Australian Bank Limited
Companies in Australia since 1901 (ASX)
  (in German)

Australia and New Zealand Banking Group
Banks established in 1852
Banks established in 1970
1853 establishments in Australia
Australian companies established in 1852
1852 establishments in England
English-Australian culture
Scottish-Australian culture
Defunct banks of Australia
British companies established in 1852